Journal of the American Psychiatric Nurses Association is a peer-reviewed academic journal that publishes papers six times a year in the field of Psychiatry. The journal's editor is Karen Farchaus Stein (University of Rochester). It has been in publication since 1995 and is currently published by SAGE Publications in association with American Psychiatric Nurses Association.

Scope 
Journal of the American Psychiatric Nurses Association publishes up-to-date information, aiming to improve mental health care for culturally diverse individuals and shape health care policy for the delivery of mental health services. The journal publishes both clinical and research articles relevant to psychiatric nursing.

Abstracting and indexing 
Journal of the American Psychiatric Nurses Association is abstracted and indexed in the following databases:
 CINAHL
 EBSCO
 MEDLINE
 Ovid
 PsycINFO
 SCOPUS

External links 
 

SAGE Publishing academic journals
English-language journals
Neurology journals